The Taipei Confucius Temple is a Confucian temple in Datong District, Taipei, Taiwan.

History

Qing Dynasty
The Taipei Confucius Temple was built in 1879 during the Qing era, after Taipeh Prefecture was established in 1875.

Empire of Japan
The newly completed temple had only been in use for a few years when World War II broke out. The Japanese ordered an end to traditional Chinese ceremonies, and Japanese Shinto ritual music was played in the temple for a brief period until 1945 when Taiwan was handed over from Japan to the Republic of China.

Republic of China
After the handover of Taiwan from Japan to the Republic of China in 1945, the temple was temporarily used to house the Examination Yuan until 1951 when the office was moved to Muzha District. During the COVID-19 pandemic in 2020, visitors to the temple are required to maintain social distance and their numbers are regulated to ensure safety.

Architecture
The temple is modeled after the original Confucius Temple in Qufu, Shandong. Among the Confucius temples in Taiwan, Taipei's is the only one adorned with southern Fujian-style ceramic adornments. At the main hall of the temple one can see a black plaque with gold lettering which was inscribed by Chiang Kai-shek that reads "Educate without Discrimination." The temple features 4D theater which showcases the journey of Confucius and the history of the temple.

Events
Every year on September 28, a ceremony with traditional music and stylized dancing is held at the temple in honor of Confucius. The temple is also the place where students, accompanied by their parents, pay a visit before their college entrance exam to seek for blessing.

Transportation
The temple is accessible within walking distance West from Yuanshan Station of the Taipei Metro.

See also
Temple of Confucius
Dalongdong Baoan Temple, located nearby Confucius Temple.
Bangka Lungshan Temple, Wanhua District
Bangka Qingshui Temple, Wanhua District
Xingtian Temple, Zhongshan District
Ciyou Temple, Songshan District
Guandu Temple, Beitou District
List of temples in Taiwan

References

External links

Confucius Temple website
Part of the Temple website with video of the ceremony

1879 establishments in Taiwan
Confucian temples in Taiwan
Religious buildings and structures completed in 1879
Temples in Taipei